Maodo Malick Nguirane (born 10 November 1993 in Yeumbeul, Senegal) is a Senegalese international basketball player who plays for Basket Zaragoza of the Liga ACB, the top basketball division in Spain.

Pro career
Nguirane arrived to Spain in 2007, at the age of 14, to join  Club Baloncesto Torrejón.

After several seasons at the youth teams of  Unicaja Málaga, in the 2013–14 season he played for the Clínicas Rincón of LEB Oro. In the summer of 2014 he signed a contract with Unicaja Málaga, and he became a part of the roster of the team, playing both the Liga ACB and the Euroleague.

In the summer of 2016 he signed for TAU Castelló of LEB Oro, and became a decisive player in his team, averaging 10 points, 6.4 rebounds and 1.2 blocks per game.

National team

In March, 2017, he was selected to participate with the Senegal National team in the FIBA AfroBasket 2017 qualifiers. Nguirane played 3 games, and Senegal qualified for the Tournament.

References

External links
Profile at Eurobasket.com
Profile at RealGM.com
Profile at ACB.com
Profile at FEB.es

1993 births
Living people
AB Castelló players
Baloncesto Málaga players
Basket Navarra Club players
Basket Zaragoza players
Fundación CB Granada players
Hermine Nantes Basket players
Liga ACB players
Saint-Vallier Basket Drôme players
Senegalese expatriate basketball people in Bulgaria
Senegalese expatriate basketball people in France
Senegalese expatriate basketball people in Spain
Senegalese expatriate basketball people in Tunisia
Senegalese men's basketball players
People from Dakar Region
Power forwards (basketball)